Ruslan Ravilyevich Imayev (born 1 February 1994) is a Russian football defender. He plays for FC Zorkiy Krasnogorsk.

Club career
He made his debut in the Russian Second Division for FC Kaluga on 22 July 2013 in a game against FC Dynamo Bryansk.

He made his Russian Football National League debut for FC Neftekhimik Nizhnekamsk on 11 July 2016 in a game against FC Yenisey Krasnoyarsk.

References

External links
 
 

1994 births
Footballers from Moscow
Living people
Russian footballers
Association football defenders
FC Znamya Truda Orekhovo-Zuyevo players
FC Neftekhimik Nizhnekamsk players
FC Dacia Chișinău players
Moldovan Super Liga players
Russian expatriate footballers
Expatriate footballers in Moldova
Russian expatriate sportspeople in Moldova